Events in the year 1849 in India.

Events
 1 August – Great Indian Peninsula Railway was incorporated  by an act of the British Parliament
 2nd Sikh War, 1848-49.
 29 March– Annexation of Punjab.
Annexation of Jaitpur and Sambalpur.

Law
Admiralty Offences (Colonial) Act (British statute)

References

 
India
Years of the 19th century in India